Kim Kang-hoon (born Kim Jong-woon; August 24, 1984), better known by his stage name Yesung is a South Korean singer, songwriter, actor, radio personality and television presenter. He debuted in 2005 as a member of Super Junior and its subgroups Super Junior-K.R.Y. (2006), Super Junior-H (2008) and participated in SM Entertainment's projects SM The Ballad (2014). Aside from group activities, he has recorded songs for various television dramas and movies, participated in various television dramas, movies, musicals and radio hosting.

He began his solo career in 2016 with his first extended play, Here I Am.

Biography
Yesung was born Kim Jong-woon on August 24, 1984, as the older son of two; his younger brother's name is Kim Jong-jin. Yesung has since changed his name to Kim Kang-hoon. He was born in Seoul and later moved to Cheonan, South Chungcheong at age 10. From a young age, Yesung expressed an interest in singing. In 1999, he joined a broadcast singing competition and won gold at the Cheonan Singing Competition. In 2001, Yesung's mother, Im Bo-kyung, signed him up to audition for SM Entertainment's Starlight Casting System, in which he impressed the judges with his "artistic voice", and signed as trainee under SM Entertainment that same year. His label gave him the stage name Yesung which is derived from the Korean phrase "예술가의 성대" (lit. meaning: vocal cords of an artist) and can be translated as an "art-like voice ".  Yesung is a tenor.

Career

2005–2007: Debut, sub-unit debut and acting activities

Yesung officially debuted as part of 12-member project group Super Junior 05 on November 6, 2005 on SBS's music programme Popular Songs, performing their first single, "Twins (Knock Out)". Their debut album SuperJunior05 (Twins) was released a month later on December 5, 2005 and debuted at #3 on the monthly MIAK K-pop album charts.

In March 2006, SM Entertainment began to recruit new members for the next Super Junior generation. However, plans changed and the company declared a halt in forming future Super Junior generations. Following the addition of thirteenth member, Kyuhyun, the group dropped the suffix "05" and became officially credited as Super Junior. The re-polished group's first CD single "U" was released on June 7, 2006, which was their most successful single until the release of "Sorry, Sorry" in March 2009. In the fall of 2007, the group released their second official album, Don't Don, which became Super Junior's best-selling album and Korea's second best-selling album of the year.

From September 2006 to September 2007, Yesung was host for radio program, M.I.R.A.C.L.E for You, where members of Super Junior often appeared as guests. However, before the radio show's first anniversary, Yesung left in order to concentrate on Super Junior's second album, Don't Don. The last air date for the radio show was September 8, 2007. In November 2006, Yesung, along with Super Junior members Ryeowook and Kyuhyun, formed a subgroup, Super Junior-K.R.Y., a group specializing in R&B ballads. The trio debuted on November 5, 2006 on KBS's Music Bank with performing Hyena soundtrack called "The One I Love".

He debut as an actor on July 26, 2007, with the release of Attack on the Pin-Up Boys, a high school comedy starring fellow Super Junior members. He played the school's rock star who gets attacked by a mysterious force.

2008–2013: Super Junior-H, K.R.Y Japan debut and Hiatus

On May 9, 2008, Yesung was sent to the hospital after he injured his leg during the 70 km 24-Hour Marathon of Hope in which he and bandmates Shindong, Sungmin, Leeteuk, Eunhyuk and Kangin participated. The event was in collaboration with the SBS charity program "Hope TV 24" and the money raised was donated to a Mongolian school in South Korea which was at risk of closing down. Due to the injury, Yesung was unable to complete the marathon, but appeared on stage on crutches with his fellow members. On August 8, Yesung was sent to the hospital after falling from a 1.5m stage while rehearsing at the KBS music program, Music Bank. The injury aggravated old injuries from the neck and waist and was hospitalised for two days. In June 2008, Yesung became a member of Super Junior-H, releasing their first mini-album titled Cooking? Cooking!.
He sang ballad track "Love Really Hurts" for the original soundtrack of television drama Tazza, which aired from September 16, to November 25, 2008. In 2009, Yesung made his musical theatre debut in Namhansanseong (lit. South Korean Mountain Fortress), which is based on the novel of the same name by Kim Hoon, which is based on the historical incident of Byeongja Horan, at the Namhansanseong in Gyeonggi-do. But the musical focuses on the lives of common people and their spirit of survival during harsh situations. Yesung played villain "Jung Myung-soo", a servant-turned-interpreter who feels sad from being betrayed by his country, from October 9 to November 4, at the Seongnam Arts Center Opera House. On November 6, he made a surprise appearance on KBS' Music Bank with label mates SHINee in place of Jonghyun, who was recovering from influenza, in a performance of "Ring Ding Dong".

In 2010, Yesung starred in the title role of musical Hong Gil Dong, alongside bandmate Sungmin who also played the historical figure Hong Gildong. It played at the Woori Financial Art Hall at the Olympic Park from February 18, to April 18, 2010. On March 31, 2010, Yesung contributed to the OST of television drama Cinderella's Sister, starring Moon Geun-young and Chun Jung-myung. The song, "It Has To Be You", is a ballad that tells the story about a man who refused to look for another girl, except for the one he loved. On June 4, Yesung performed it for the first time, and his first solo stage, on Music Bank which reached #3 on show's K-Chart.

In July 2010, Yesung appeared with bandmate Leeteuk as MC's for MBC's Love Pursuer. The show presents a Korean celebrity being showered with affection from a secret admirer, with the challenge of guessing who the admirer is. Yesung was himself the subject of admiration in episode 10. During the recording of Dream Team 2 on August 21, 2011, he fell from a platform and strained his waist again, but was reported to be a minor injury. On September 4, he became the new MC for MUZIT, a musical talk show alongside K.Will and veteran composer Yoo Young-suk. It showcased various musical talents from the Korean music industry.

From October 1 to October 28, 2010, he starred in his third musical Spamalot playing the main role of Sir Galahad.

On December 29, 2010, Yesung together with Luna of f(x), sang the track "Loving You", on part two of the original soundtrack of KBS drama President.

On January 31, 2011, Yesung's third solo song, from the OST of SBS drama, Paradise Ranch, was released. "Waiting For You" is a ballad that tells the story of a man who is adamant on waiting until the end of the world for his lover to return to him. He performed it for the first time at the Super Junior K.R.Y The 1st Concert in Seoul on February 11.

From February 28 to June 21, 2011, Yesung temporarily replaced bandmate Eunhyuk as radio DJ partnering with Leeteuk on Super Junior's Kiss the Radio, while Eunhyuk was away on promotional activities for Super Junior-M's third EP Perfection. In June, he joined KBS's Immortal Songs 2 where singers render their own versions of old songs from music legends and winners are selected by voting. He lost in the first episode but won the third episode when he sang Boohwal's song "The More I Love".

His second duet with Jang Hyejin, was released on July 14, 2011 throughout Korea's digital charts. "I Am Behind You" is from the album Cooperation Part 1 . The song has a fantastic harmony and is mixed with the lyrics of secretly loving someone and wondering if that person could possibly be feeling the same way about them. On July 18, 2011, "For One Day" was released. It is from the OST SBS historical drama Warrior Baek Dong Soo . The song explores an emotional farewell from a lover. Yesung performed this live for the first time on October 6, 2011 at the K.R.Y Concert in Nanjing.

On September 27, 2011, he along with Eunhyuk and Shindong filled in for bandmate Heechul, who enlisted for mandatory military service on September 1, during the performance on Music Bank and Show! Music Core of Kim Jang-hoon latest single, "Breakups are So Like Me". Heechul is featured in the song and starred in the music video, which was completed the day before he enlisted.

On October 23, 2011, Yesung as part of Super Junior performed in the New York SM Town concert at Madison Square Garden. The cover photo of the New York Times, section C, featured Super Junior with a close up of Yesung.

On November 11, 2012, Yesung along with his brother Kim Jong-jin officially opened their cafe "Mouse Rabbit Coffee" after their franchise, "Babtols" and "Handel & Gretel".

In November 2012, Super Junior K.R.Y. held a concert tour in Japan, Super Junior K.R.Y. Special Winter Concert. They announced that they would be releasing their first single 6 years after debut. The teaser for "Promise You" was released on November 21, 2012, followed by the single on January 23, 2013. It debuted at number two on the Oricon's daily singles chart.

On February 13, 2013, Yesung's OST "Gray Paper" for SBS melodrama That Winter, the Wind Blows was released. The track was composed by label mate Kangta and where he went on to performe it on SBS's music program Inkigayo on February 17.

Yesung announced at the Seoul concert of Super Show 5 that he would enlist for his mandatory military service in 2013. He served as a public service worker after four weeks of basic training. He enlisted May 6, 2013, causing him to not take part in the South American leg of Super Show 5 onwards.

2014–2015: SM The Ballad and continued comeback with Super Junior
During his military service in February 2014, Yesung joined the ballad group SM the Ballad, initially formed by SM Entertainment in 2010. On the group's 2nd album, he had a solo song for the track "Blind", which releasing on Korean and Japanese version sung by Yesung, however didn't participate with the promotions.

Super Junior-K.R.Y. reunited with Yesung's return from military service Super Junior-K.R.Y. A Japan Tour was started in Yokohama on June 2–3 and had 11 total performances in arenas in Kobe, Fukuoka, and Nagoya. In July 2015, SM Entertainment announced Super Junior-K.R.Y. kick-started their Asia tour in Seoul at the Olympic Hall in Seoul on August 22 and 23. The trio released Japanese single Japan titled "Join Hands" on August 5, 2015.

On July 8, 2015, SM Entertainment announced that Yesung would re-join Super Junior for the special album, Devil which was released on July 16, to celebrate the group's 10th anniversary.

In August, Yesung solo song Dreaming from the OST of MBC drama, Splendid Politics was released. In November, Yesung played a role in Korean drama Songgot: The Piercer.

2016–present: Solo debut and collaborations
Yesung released his first extended play Here I Am on April 19, 2016. The album contains seven tracks, with the lead single titled "Here I Am". Yesung made his solo debut stage on M countdown on April 21. Yesung held his first solo concert titled Sweet Coffee, part of S.M. Entertainment concert series "The AGIT", held from June 3 to June 19, 2016.

On November 18, 2016, it was confirmed that Yesung would join OCN's upcoming drama Voice, to air in January 2017.

On April 18, 2017, Yesung released his second extended play titled Spring Falling. The album contains six tracks, with the lead single titled "Paper Umbrella".

In December 2018 Yesung released a digital single titled "Whatcha Doin'? (지금 어디야?)" with and Chungha. Later in January, 2019, Yesung released a digital Jazz single titled "Carpet" with Bumkey.

Yesung released his first Japanese album on February 20, 2019 titled Story. The album contains eleven tracks, with the lead singles titled "いま会いにゆきます (If You)" and "Because I Love You (大切な絆)". He also began his tour, Super Junior-Yesung Special Live - Y's STORY, in February 2019, with stops at Tokyo, Osaka, Nagoya and Fukuoka. On June 18, 2019, he released his third extended play, Pink Magic, with its lead single of the same name.

On May 3, 2021, Yesung released his fourth extended play Beautiful Night, consisting of seven tracks, including the lead single of the same name.

In October 2022, Yesung released the single "After Love" from the Casting in the Corner project with Solar, a remix of the 2006 version.

Discography

 Story (2019)
 Sensory Flows (2023)

Filmography

Films

Television series

Television shows

Radio shows

Musical theatre

Concert and tours 
South Korea
 The Agit: Sweet Coffee – Yesung (2016)
 Yesung Solo Concert '봄悲' (2017)

Japan
 Super Junior-Yesung Japan Tour 2016 ~Books~
 Super Junior-Yesung Special Live "Y's SONG" (2017)
 Super Junior-Yesung Special Live "Y's STORY" (2019) 
 Super Junior-Yesung Special Event: ~I'll Light Your Way~ (2021)

Awards and nominations

References

External links

 

1984 births
Living people
People from Cheonan
Japanese-language singers
South Korean male idols
South Korean pop singers
South Korean male singers
South Korean pianists
South Korean rhythm and blues singers
South Korean male film actors
South Korean male musical theatre actors
South Korean male television actors
South Korean television presenters
South Korean radio presenters
Super Junior members
Super Junior-H members
Super Junior-K.R.Y. members
Male pianists
South Korean tenors